Sun Fajing (born 3 October 1996) is a Chinese tennis player.

Sun has a career high ATP singles ranking of world No. 351 achieved on 10 February 2020. He also has a career high ATP doubles ranking of world No. 223 achieved on 14 October 2019. He has reached 10 career singles finals posting a record of 3 wins and 7 losses, all coming on the ITF Futures tour. Additionally, he has reached 17 doubles finals posting a record of 10 wins and 7 losses, which includes 2 ATP Challenger Tour doubles titles.

Sun made his ATP main draw debut at the 2016 Chengdu Open, where he was granted a wild card entry in the doubles draw alongside compatriot He Yecong. They were defeated in the first round by Raven Klaasen and Rajeev Ram in straight sets 4–6, 5–7. The following year, he was again given a wild card at the 2017 Chengdu Open with partner Te Rigele, and again he would lose in the first round to Nenad Zimonjic and Santiago Gonzalez in straight sets 4–6, 4–6. In his third main draw appearance, he and partner Zhizhen Zhang were given a wild card entry into the doubles draw of the 2018 ATP Shenzhen Open but lost in the first round to Marcin Matkowski and Nicholas Monroe 4–6, 2–6. His fourth and most recent ATP appearance (also his third at the tournament) was a wild card entry into the doubles draw of the 2019 Chengdu Open pairing up with Wang Aoran, and to round up an 0–4 record he lost to Dominic Inglot and Austin Krajicek 1–6, 6–0, [8–10].

ATP Challenger and ITF Futures finals

Singles: 11 (3–8)

Doubles: 24 (13–11)

External links

1996 births
Living people
Chinese male tennis players
Tennis players from Shanxi